Kenneth Fink is an American television director and television producer of several television series. Prior to directing, Fink was a television documentary-segment producer. He has directed many episodes of several series including: Dawson's Creek, Oz, Nash Bridges, CSI: Crime Scene Investigation, Millennium, Fringe, Revenge, Nikita, Arrow, Quantico, Charmed and CSI: Vegas.

References

External links

American television directors
American television producers
Living people
Place of birth missing (living people)
Year of birth missing (living people)